Protein prune homolog 2 is a protein that in humans is encoded by the PRUNE2 gene.

References

Further reading